Standards in Norway is a live album by American pianist Keith Jarrett's "Standards Trio" featuring Gary Peacock and Jack DeJohnette recorded in concert in October, 1989 at the Konserthuset in Oslo (Norway) and released by ECM Records in 1995.

October 1989 Tour
Standards in Norway was recorded in concert during the "Standards trio" October 1989 European tour in which, according to www.keithjarrett.org, offered 14 recitals in 28 days:

 1 - Palais des Beaux-Arts, Brussels (Belgium)
 3 - Berwaldhallen, Stockholm (Sweden)
 5 - Koncertsalen i Tivoli, Copenhagen (Denmark)
 7 - Konserthuset, Oslo (Norway) [Standards In Norway]
 9 - Royal Festival Hall, London (England)
 11 - Graf-Zeppelin-Haus, Friedrichshafen (Germany)
 15 - Philharmonie, Cologne (Germany) recorded and released as Tribute [ECM 1420/21]
 16 - Philharmonie, Gasteig, Munich (Germany) 
 18 - Musikhalle, Hamburg (Germany) 
 19 - Kongreßalle Killesberg, Stuttgart (Germany) 
 21 - Alte Oper, Frankfurt (Germany) 
 23 - Palais de la Musique, Strasbourg (France)
 25 - Arsenal, Metz (France)
 28 - Théâtre des Champs-Elysées, Paris (France)

Reception 
The Allmusic review by Scott Yanow awarded the album 3 stars and states, "none of the eight performances from the concert appearance are throwaways. Jarrett's vocal sounds are more restrained than usual while his piano playing is in peak form".

Track listing
 "All of You" (Cole Porter) - 8:16  
 "Little Girl Blue" (Lorenz Hart, Richard Rodgers) - 6:44  
 "Just in Time" (Betty Comden, Adolph Green, Jule Styne) - 11:04  
 "Old Folks" (Willard Robison) - 10:42  
 "Love is a Many-Splendored Thing" (Sammy Fain, Paul Francis Webster) - 7:26  
 "Dedicated to You" (Sammy Cahn, Saul Chaplin, Hy Zaret) - 12:19  
 "I Hear a Rhapsody" (Jack Baker, George Fragos, Dick Gasparre) - 10:57  
 "How About You?" (Ralph Freed, Burton Lane) - 5:55
Total effective playing time: 68:20 (the album contains 5:03 applause approximately)

Personnel
Keith Jarrett – piano
Gary Peacock - bass
Jack DeJohnette - drums

Technical Personnel 
 Jan Erik Kongshaug - Recording Engineer
 Barbara Wojirsch - Cover Design 
 Manfred Eicher - Production

References 

Standards Trio albums
Gary Peacock live albums
Jack DeJohnette live albums
Keith Jarrett live albums
1989 live albums
ECM Records live albums
Albums produced by Manfred Eicher